This is a timeline of Tongan history, comprising important legal and territorial changes and political events in Tonga and its predecessor states.  To read about the background to these events, see History of Tonga.  See also the list of monarchs of Tonga and list of prime ministers of Tonga.

Before 1st century

1st to 10th centuries

11th century

12th century

13th century

14th century

15th century

16th century

17th century

18th century

19th century

20th century

21st century

References 
Queen Salote of Tonga: The Story of an Era 1900-1965
Latukefu, S. (1974), Church and State in Tonga, ANU Press, Canberra
Campbell, Ian C; Island Kingdom: Tonga Ancient and Modern, 2001, 
"Brief history of the Kingdom of Tonga", on the website of the Tongan Parliament

 
Tongan